Muktar Kedir is an Ethiopian politician who was President of the Oromia Region, the country's largest region, from 18 February 2014 to 20 September 2016.

Early life and education

Muktar was born in Jimma. He received a degree from the Ethiopian Civil Service College in law and studied at Azusa Pacific University, He received an honorary doctorate from Kyungwon University in South Korea in August 2014.

Career

Muktar joined the Oromo Peoples' Democratic Organization (OPDO) in the mid-1990s, and was appointed administrator of the Jimma Zone in 1999, serving in the post until 2003. From 2008 to 2010 he served as Vice-President of the Oromia Region; muktar transformed the regions agriculture center, horticulture and expanded education into the faucet of the countries rural area under his presidency. He encouraged small business through government driven loan to micro enterprises and tried to solve the overwhelming unemployment of the youth. The region scored double digit economic development under his administration. In 2010 he was appointed Head of the Office of the Prime Minister and Minister for Cabinet Affairs.

From 2012 to 2014 he was one of the country's three deputy prime Ministers, serving with Debretsion Gebremichael and Demeke Mekonnen, considered "a loyal politician and trusted ally of Prime Minister Hailemariam Desalegn" was appointed minister for the civil service.

Regional presidency
Muktar succeeded the ailing Alemayehu Atomsa as President of the Oromia Region on 18 February 2014.

References

Year of birth missing (living people)
Living people
Presidents of Oromia Region
Deputy Prime Ministers of Ethiopia
Government ministers of Ethiopia
21st-century Ethiopian politicians
Oromo Democratic Party politicians
Azusa Pacific University alumni
People from Jimma